Mulyani is an Indonesian surname. Notable people with the surname include:

Sri Mulyani (born 1962), Indonesian economist
Vera Mulyani, Indonesian architect, filmmaker, and children's author

Indonesian-language surnames